GPRename is a computer program for renaming multiple files and directories at one time. GPRename is written in Perl, and runs on any Unix-like operating system.

Features 
 Rename both files and directories
 Case change: to UPPERCASE, to lowercase or Only The First Letter
 Insert or delete text at a position
 Replace text with the option of case sensitive
 Search text with the option of regular expression
 Rename with numbers (001.jpg, 002.jpg, 003.jpg...)
 Automatically trim double spaces to one space, also trim leading and/or trailing spaces around the name
 Multilingual : Brazilian Portuguese, English, French, Polish, Spanish

History 
At the start of 2007, GPRename has been ported from the deprecated GTK-Perl to the new GTK2-Perl and in mid-2007 the new 2.4 release is now GPL-3.

Reception
Jack Wallen writing in ghacks.net in August 2010 said:

References

External links

 

Free file managers
Free software programmed in Perl